Live and Burning is a live album by the blues musician Son Seals, released through Alligator Records in 1978.

Production
The album was recorded at Wise Fools Pub, in Chicago, Illinois. It was produced by Bruce Iglauer.

Critical reception
The Bay State Banner wrote that "the small band clicks well behind Son ... The minimal production and somewhat weak mix don't affect the music's quality greatly."

Track listing
"I Can't Hold Out" – 4:14
"Blue Shadows Falling" – 6:07
"Funky Bitch" – 3:46
"The Woman I Love" – 7:18
"Help Me, Somebody" - 5:20
"She's Fine" – 3:44
"Call My Job" – 4:42
"Last Night" – 6:46
"Hot Sauce" – 2:50

References

External links
Alligator Records - Genuine Houserockin' Music Since 1971

1978 live albums
Son Seals albums
albums produced by Bruce Iglauer
Alligator Records live albums